Slater Menswear, also referred to as Slaters, is a Scottish menswear retailer with 26 stores across England, Wales and Scotland. It is family-run and was founded in 1904 in Glasgow by Samuel Slater as a tailor's shop. His son Ralph diversified the business into retail in 1973. Its current managing director is his grandson Paul.

The first-ever store was opened on Howard Street in Glasgow, and this is still the brand's biggest store, as well as being home to their head office; this store was named as the world's largest single menswear store by the Guinness World Records.

History
The business was founded in 1904 by Samuel Slater originally as tailor's shop in Glasgow. His sons joined the business and helped to grow the company. One of his son's Ralph established the retail business in 1973 following a fire which nearly closed the company. The first store opened on Howard Street. Further stores opened in Ayr and Manchester in the 1980s with a rapid expansion in the 1990s resulting in a total of 23 stores.

As of 2022, Slater Menswear has a total of 26 stores across Great Britain. The latest being opened in Chelmsford, Essex in 2018. Its flagship store in Glasgow was listed by the Guinness World Records as the largest single menswear shop in the world.

Stores
Slater Menswear stores can be found in the following locations:
England: Basingstoke, Birmingham, Bolton, Bristol, Bromley, Canterbury, Chelmsford, Cheltenham, Hull, Leeds, Liverpool, Manchester, Newcastle, Norwich, Nottingham, Preston, Reading
Scotland: Aberdeen, Ayr, Dundee, Edinburgh, Glasgow, Inverness, Stirling
Wales: Cardiff, Swansea

References

Clothing companies of Scotland
Companies based in Glasgow
Clothing companies established in 1973
1973 establishments in Scotland
1973 establishments in the United Kingdom
Clothing companies of the United Kingdom
Clothing retailers of Scotland
Menswear designers